Víctor Mosquera Chaux (October 1, 1919 – November 5, 1997) was a Colombian lawyer and diplomat. A Liberal party politician, he served as Councilman of Popayán, Assemblymean of Cauca, Chamber Representative for Cauca, Senator of Colombia, and Governor of Cauca. He also served as Ambassador of Colombia to the United States, and Ambassador of Colombia to the United Kingdom.

In February 1981, Mosquera held executive power for eight days as Presidential Designate, while President Julio César Turbay Ayala was indisposed due to health reasons.

References

1919 births
1997 deaths
People from Popayán
Colombian people of Galician descent
Presidential Designates of Colombia
Colombian Liberal Party politicians
Ambassadors of Colombia to the United Kingdom
Ambassadors of Colombia to the United States